Captain Corelli's Mandolin is a 2001 war film directed by John Madden. It is based on the 1994 novel Captain Corelli's Mandolin by Louis de Bernières. The film pays homage to the thousands of Italian soldiers executed at the Massacre of the Acqui Division by German forces in Cephalonia in September 1943, and to the people of Cephalonia who were killed in the post-war earthquake. The novel's protagonists are portrayed by actors Nicolas Cage and Penélope Cruz.

Plot
Greece's Ionian Islands are occupied by the Italian Army when it brings a large garrison along with a few Germans to the tranquil island of Cephalonia, whose inhabitants surrender immediately. Captain Antonio Corelli, an officer of the Italian 33rd Acqui Infantry Division, has a jovial personality and a passion for the mandolin, and trains his battery of men (who have never fired a shot) to choral sing. Initially he alienates a number of villagers, including Pelagia, the daughter of the village doctor. She is an educated and strong-willed woman. At first offended by the Italian soldier's behaviour, she slowly warms to Corelli's charm, and mandolin playing, as they are forced to share her father's home after the doctor agrees to put him up in exchange for medical supplies.

When Pelagia's fiancé, Mandras, a local fisherman, heads off to war on the mainland, the friendship between Antonio and Pelagia grows. Her beauty and intelligence have captured Corelli's heart, and his fondness for the village's vibrant community has caused him to question his reasons for fighting. Corelli, and his battery of musical troops, becomes a part of the villagers' lives; but the moment is fleeting. As the war grows closer, Antonio and Pelagia are forced to choose between their allegiances and the love they feel for one another.

The Italian government surrenders to the Allies, and the Italian troops happily prepare to return home. However, their erstwhile allies, the Germans, insist on disarming them, intemperately and violently. The Greeks are also exposed to the brutality of the incoming Germans, and arrange with the Italians to use their arms in a brief but futile resistance. For this, the German High Command has thousands of the Italian troops shot as traitors. Corelli survives when one of his soldiers shields him from the fusillade of the German executioners' bullets with his body, and falls dead on top of him.  Mandras finds Corelli, still alive among the pile of massacred soldiers, and takes him to Pelagia and the doctor for treatment and recovery, and then to a boat to escape the island. As a result of Pelagia's questioning, Mandras admits that he rescued Corelli from the heap of dead soldiers because he wanted to re-kindle their love. But it does no good and the couple part. Earlier, on one of Mandras's return visits to Cephallonia, he admits to Pelagia that the reason he never replied to her many love letters is that he is illiterate.

In 1947, Pelagia receives a parcel from Italy containing a record of the tune Corelli wrote for her, but no note. An earthquake destroys much of the village including the doctor's house; but island life continues, and, soon after, Corelli returns to Pelagia.

Cast
 Nicolas Cage as Captain Antonio Corelli
 Penélope Cruz as Pelagia
 John Hurt as Dr. Yiannis
 Christian Bale as Mandras
 David Morrissey as Captain Günther Weber
 Irene Papas as Drosoula
 Piero Maggio as Carlo
 Gerasimos Skiadaressis as Mr. Stamatis
 Aspasia Kralli as Mrs. Stamatis
 Michael Yannatos as Kokolios
 Dimitris Kaberidis as Father Arsenios
 Pietro Sarubbi as Velisarios, The Strongman
 Viki Maragaki as Eleni, Pelagia's friend
 Joanna-Daria Adraktas as Young Lemoni
 Ira Tavlaridis as Older Lemoni
 Katerina Didaskalou as Lemoni's mother
 Emilios Chilakis as Dimitris
 Panagis Polichronatos as Partisan
 Patrick Malahide as Colonel Johannes Barge
 George Kotanidis as Mayor

Reception

Box office
The film grossed $13.8 million in the United Kingdom. The film opened at number six at the US box office, taking in $7,209,345 in its opening weekend and went on to gross $25,543,895 in the United States and Canada. It grossed an additional $22.8 million internationally for a total of $62,112,895 worldwide against a cost of $57 million.

Critical response
The film's plot deviated somewhat from the novel's, with many of the book's tragic episodes softened. On Rotten Tomatoes it has an approval rating of 28% based on reviews from 118 critics, with an average rating of 4.5/10. The website's critical consensus reads: "The cinematography is gorgeous, but the movie plays it fast and loose with history and the novel it was adapted from. Mostly, the movie fails because the romance between the leads strains credulity and the story is largely uninvolving." On Metacritic, the film has a weighted average score of 36 out of 100, based on reviews from 33 critics, indicating "generally unfavorable reviews".

Derek Elley of Variety praised the beautiful on location shoot, but was critical of the film and wrote that it "Strikes too many false notes on the dramatic side to add up to a satisfying emotional experience."
Roger Ebert of the Chicago Sun-Times gave the film 2 out of 4, and suggested the film might have worked better with subtitles, pointing out the absurdity of one scene "where something is said in English pronounced with one accent, and a character asks, What did he say? and he is told -- in English pronounced with another accent."

References

Further reading
 Tibbetts, John C., and James M. Welsh, eds. The Encyclopedia of Novels Into Film (2nd ed. 2005) pp 72–75.

External links
 
 
 
 

2001 films
2000s war drama films
French war drama films
British war drama films
American war drama films
English-language French films
Greek-language films
2000s German-language films
2000s Italian-language films
Films distributed by Disney
Films directed by John Madden
Films scored by Stephen Warbeck
Films based on British novels
Films set in Axis-occupied Greece
Films set in the Mediterranean Sea
Films set on islands
Films shot in Greece
Films set in Greece
Working Title Films films
StudioCanal films
Films produced by Eric Fellner
Films produced by Tim Bevan
Italian occupation of Greece during World War II
2001 drama films
2000s American films
2000s British films
2000s French films